The MSCI World is a market cap weighted stock market index of 1,508 constituents throughout the world. It is maintained by MSCI, formerly Morgan Stanley Capital International, and is used as a common benchmark for 'world' or 'global' stock funds intended to represent a broad cross-section of global markets.

The index includes a collection of stocks of all the developed markets in the world, as defined by MSCI. The index includes securities from 23 countries excluding stocks from emerging and frontier economies making it less worldwide than the name suggests. A related index, the MSCI All Country World Index (ACWI), incorporated both developed and emerging countries. MSCI also produces a Frontier Markets index, including another 31 markets.

The MSCI World Index has been calculated since 1969, in various forms: without dividends (Price Index), with net or with gross dividends reinvested (Net and Gross Index), in US dollars, Euro and local currencies.

Countries/Regions
The index includes companies in the following countries/regions:

 Australia
 Austria
 Belgium
 Canada
 Denmark
 Finland
 France
 Germany
 Hong Kong
 Ireland
 Israel
 Italy
 Japan
 Netherlands
 New Zealand
 Norway
 Portugal
 Singapore
 Spain
 Sweden
 Switzerland
 United Kingdom
 United States

Total annual returns

(a) Total returns including reinvested dividends.

See also
 FTSE Global Equity Index Series (FTSE All-World Index)
 Exchange-traded fund
 MSCI EAFE
 S&P Global 1200
 Stock market index

References

Global stock market indices